Samia Yaba Christina Nkrumah (born 23 June 1960) is a Ghanaian politician and chairperson of the Convention People's Party (CPP). In the 2008 parliamentary election, she won the Jomoro constituency seat at her first attempt. She is the daughter of Kwame Nkrumah, first President of Ghana.

Early life and education 
Samia was born at Aburi in the Eastern Region of Ghana in 1960. She was forced to leave Ghana with her mother and brothers on the day of the 1966 military coup that overthrew Kwame Nkrumah. The family were resettled in Egypt by the Egyptian government. She returned with her family in 1975 at the invitation of General Acheampong's National Redemption Council government and attended Achimota School. However, she left the country again when her mother decided to return to Egypt in the early 1980s. Samia proceeded to London, later completing her studies at the School of Oriental and African Studies of the University of London in the United Kingdom, where she obtained the degree of Bachelor Arabic Studies in 1991. She also completed a Master's degree at the same institution in 1993.

Career
Samia Nkrumah started work as a bank clerk with the London branch of the Bank of India in 1984. She then worked with Al-Ahram as a journalist in various capacities starting from 1989.

Politics 
In an article about her, entitled "The new Mandela is a woman", the Huffington Post described and analysed her impact on Ghanaian and African politics. She is one of the founders of Africa Must Unite, which aims to promote Kwame Nkrumah's vision and political culture. As part of this philosophy, she decided to go into active politics in Ghana.

Member of Parliament 
In December 2008, she contested the Jomoro constituency seat in the Western Region of Ghana and beat the incumbent MP, Lee Ocran of the National Democratic Congress (NDC) with a majority of 6,571, winning about 50% of the total valid votes cast. Being the only CPP member of parliament, she had to either align with NDC who were the majority in parliament or the minority NPP. She decided on the latter, aligning with the NPP in the House of 5th Parliament of the 4th Republic of Ghana.

Chairperson of CPP 
She became the first woman to ever head a major political party in Ghana. Her victory, along with three other female members of the party, is hailed as marking the renaissance of the ailing CPP, and an affirmation of the party's long held tradition of promoting women's rights. She was elected as the first woman chairperson of the Convention People's Party on 10 September 2011. She won the poll with 1,191 votes, and her nearest contender, the incumbent, polled 353 votes. With this feat, she became the first woman to ever head a major political party in Ghana. She served in this role until 2015.

Personal life

Samia is the second child of Kwame Nkrumah, Ghana's first President and Fathia Nkrumah. Kwame Nkrumah was the first Prime Minister and President of Ghana, having led the Gold Coast to independence from Britain in 1957.

An influential advocate of pan-Africanism, Nkrumah was a founding member of the Organization of African Unity and winner of the Lenin Peace Prize from the Soviet Union in 1962.

Samia has two brothers: Gamal Nkrumah, Sekou Nkrumah. She also has an older half-brother, Professor Francis Nkrumah, a retired lecturer and consultant paediatrician who worked as a director at the Noguchi Memorial Institute for Medical Research in Legon, Ghana.

After her father was overthrown in Ghana's first successful military coup d'état on 24 February 1966, Samia, her mother, and her brothers, had to flee to Cairo, Egypt on a plane sent by Egyptian President, Gamal Abdel Nasser, to stay in the country while her father went into exile in Guinea.

She is married to Michele Melega, an Italian-Danish man. They have a son, Kwame Thomas Melega. Samia is fluent in Arabic, Italian, Danish, and English. She has worked many years as a journalist and media consultant, including in the Egyptian media space. She is also an advocate against child marriage, for women's empowerment, and women's affairs.

References

External links
Convention People Party.org: 
The Huffingtonpost:
Financial Times: 
Jeune Afrique: 
Ghanaweb:
Ghana Broadcasting Corporation: 
Citifmonline: 
Ghana to Ghana.com: 

1960 births
Living people
Alumni of SOAS University of London
Convention People's Party (Ghana) politicians
Ghanaian journalists
Ghanaian MPs 2009–2013
Ghanaian people of Coptic descent
Ghanaian people of Egyptian descent
Kwame Nkrumah
Alumni of Achimota School
Children of national leaders
Ghanaian pan-Africanists
21st-century Ghanaian women politicians
Women members of the Parliament of Ghana
Ghanaian women journalists